August Rinaldi (1883–1962) was a German art director. He worked on around fifty films during the silent era. Rinaldi was of Jewish descent.

Selected filmography
 Let There Be Light (1917)
 Diary of a Lost Woman (1918)
 The Face Removed (1920)
 Blackmailed (1920)
 Waves of Life and Love (1921)
 The Railway King (1921)
 Circus People (1922)
 The Game of Love (1924)
 The Circus of Life (1926)
 The Tales of Hermann (1926)
 The Field Marshal (1927)
 A Girl of the People (1927)
 Girls, Beware! (1928)
 Sixteen Daughters and No Father (1928)
 The Women's War (1928)
 Somnambul (1929)
 Sin and Morality (1929)
 Crucified Girl (1929)
 Miss Midshipman (1929)
 Marriage Strike (1930)

References

Bibliography
 Prawer, S.S. Between Two Worlds: The Jewish Presence in German and Austrian Film, 1910-1933. Berghahn Books, 2005.

External links

1883 births
1962 deaths
German art directors
Jewish emigrants from Nazi Germany to the United States